Donald Frederick Otten (April 18, 1921 – September 18, 1985) was an American professional basketball player.

A 6'10" center from Bellefontaine High School (Ohio) and Bowling Green State University, Otten began his professional career in 1946 with the Tri-Cities Blackhawks of the National Basketball League. During the 1948–49 NBL season, Otten averaged 14.0 points per game and earned league MVP honors. The Blackhawks joined the National Basketball Association (NBA) in 1949, and Otten continued playing until 1953, competing for Tri-Cities as well as the Washington Capitols, Baltimore Bullets, Fort Wayne Pistons, and Milwaukee Hawks. He averaged 10.5 points per game in his NBA career.  Don's brother Mac Otten also played in the NBA. In 1949, Don and Mac became the first ever pair of brothers to play for the same team in the NBA.

Otten is tied at first for the NBA record for most personal fouls in a game, with eight. He set the record in a November 24, 1949 game between Tri-Cities and the Sheboygan Red Skins.  NBA Rule 3, Section I permits a player to remain in the game after fouling out if no other players are available on the bench.

NBA career statistics

Regular season

Playoffs

References

1921 births
1985 deaths
All-American college men's basketball players
American men's basketball players
Baltimore Bullets (1944–1954) players
Basketball players from Ohio
Bowling Green Falcons men's basketball players
Centers (basketball)
Fort Wayne Pistons players
Milwaukee Hawks players
People from Bellefontaine, Ohio
Tri-Cities Blackhawks players
Washington Capitols players